608 Adolfine is a minor planet orbiting the Sun.

References

External links
 
 

Eos asteroids
Adolfine
Adolfine
19060918